Cham Cham 
Cham Cham, Iran, a village in Kermanshah Province, Iran
 "The Cham-Cham", a 1966 episode of the TV series Thunderbirds
 Cham cham, a Bangladeshi sweet 

 Cham Cham, a character in the game series Samurai Shodown